One Man and His Hob was a British cookery show on the digital channel Taste TV. Celebrity chef Aldo Zilli traveled across the UK, creating culinary delights on a single travel cooker. Using local ingredients and enlisting the help of passers-by, he created tasty specialities at outdoor venues around the country. Each new town brings inspiration for another delicious dish - and a host of spectators, eager to indulge in some tasty treats.

The programme was made by Ginger Productions, and was re-aired on Scottish television station STV, which owned Ginger Productions. The show never had a set introduction, rather a series of mini sketches, usually involving his cameraman "Angus" - with the show logo following soon after on the screen.

References 

2001 British television series debuts
Ginger Productions